Loyola, the Soldier Saint (Spanish:El capitán de Loyola) is a 1949 Spanish historical film directed by José Díaz Morales and starring Rafael Durán, Maruchi Fresno and Manuel Luna. The film portrays the life of Ignatius of Loyola, and was part of a group of lavish historical films made in Spain during the era.

Cast
 Rafael Durán as Íñigo de Loyola  
 Maruchi Fresno as Reina Juana 
 Manuel Luna as Beltrán 
 Asunción Sancho as Marcelilla 
 José María Lado as Armador  
 José Emilio Álvarez 
 María Rosa Salgado as Infanta Catalina  
 Francisco Pierrá
 Manuel Dicenta as Pedro Fabro  
 Carlos Díaz de Mendoza 
 Manuel Kayser
 Eduardo Fajardo 
 Arturo Marín as Alcalde de Pamplona  
 Manuel Arbó 
 Dolores Moreno 
 Domingo Rivas 
 Manuel Guitián
 María Antonia Giménez 
 Rufino Inglés
 José Prada

References

Bibliography
 D'Lugo, Marvin. Guide to the Cinema of Spain. Greenwood Publishing Group, 1997.

External links

1949 films
Spanish historical drama films
1940s historical drama films
1940s Spanish-language films
Films directed by José Díaz Morales
Films set in the 16th century
Biographical films about religious leaders
Cultural depictions of Ignatius of Loyola
Spanish black-and-white films
1949 drama films
1940s Spanish films